Haldimand and Monck was a federal electoral district represented in the House of Commons of Canada from 1892 to 1904. It was located in the province of Ontario.

It was created in 1892 from parts of Haldimand and Monck ridings.

It consisted of the townships of Oneida, Rainham, Seneca, North Cayuga and South Cayuga, Canboro', Dunn, Moulton, Sherbrooke and Wainfleet, and the villages of Caledonia, Cayuga, Hagersville and Dunnville.

The electoral district was abolished in 1903 when it was redistributed between Haldimand and Welland ridings.

Election results

|}

|}

See also 

 List of Canadian federal electoral districts
 Past Canadian electoral districts

External links 
Riding history from the Library of Parliament

Former federal electoral districts of Ontario